RESCAP or ResCap may refer to:

RESCAP, a military acronym for "Rescue Combat Air Patrol"
GMAC ResCap, a defunct residential mortgage loan originator and servicer based in the American city of Minneapolis